To be distinguished from an earlier Sienese composer Alessandro Della Ciaia (c. 1605 - c. 1670)

Azzolino Bernardino della Ciaja (21 May 167115 January 1755) was an Italian organist, harpsichordist, composer and organ builder.

Life
Born in Siena, into a rich family, he was a member of the Pisan Cavalieri di S Stefano order. He lived in Pisa from 1703 and 1713, but kept strong connections with Florence. In 1713 he moved to Rome where he stayed till 1730. He moved then back to Pisa where he died.

Expert in organ building, he worked on the organ of Santo Stefano dei Cavalieri, a large 5- manual and more than 60 stop organ.

Very important are the Six Sonatas for Harpsichord published in Rome in 1727.

Works

Vocal Works
Cantate da camera, op. 2 (Lucca, 1701)
Cantate da camera op. 3 (Bologna, 1702), lost
De suoi tormenti in seno (Pisa, 1704)
Chi non sa morire (cantata)
Bella imago (cantata)
Lungi dal caro bene (cantata), Pisa, 1709

Sacred Works
Salmi concertati, op. 1 (Bologna, 1700)
Mass (Ky, Gl, Cr), 4 voices, 1696
Mass, 4–5vv, 1739
Mass (Ky, Gl, Cr), 4vv, nd
I trionfi di Giosuè (pasticcio), Florence 1703, lost

Instrumental Works
Sonate per cembalo con alcuni saggi ed altri contrapunti di largo e grave stile ecclesiastico per grandi organi, op. 4 (Rome, 1727?)

Sources
Italian Wikipedia page
Carolyn Gianturco's article in New Grove Dictionary of MusicNotes

DiscographyOpera omnia for keyboard''. Harpsichordist: Mara Fanelli - Organist: Olimpio Medori, Romani-Agati-Tronci organ with three keyboards and double pedals from Gavinana (Pistoia) - Tenore: Paolo Fanciullacci (3 CD, Tactus, 2016)

External links

Italian Baroque composers
1671 births
1755 deaths
People from Siena
Italian male classical composers
18th-century Italian composers
18th-century Italian male musicians